The William A. and Etta Baum Cottage is a historic building located in Des Moines, Iowa, United States.  Built in 1891, the 1½-story structure features a gable-end facade, brick foundation, and a small front porch with a gable-end roof.  It is considered a good example of the  gable-on-hip subtype of the Queen Anne cottage.  There were only a few that were built with 1½-stories as most were two-stories.  Its significance is based on how it demonstrates that a modest-sized dwelling can embrace the picturesque design.  The cottage was individually listed on the National Register of Historic Places in 1996.  It was included as a contributing property in the Polk County Homestead and Trust Company Addition Historic District in 2016.

References

Houses completed in 1891
Queen Anne architecture in Iowa
Houses in Des Moines, Iowa
National Register of Historic Places in Des Moines, Iowa
Houses on the National Register of Historic Places in Iowa
Individually listed contributing properties to historic districts on the National Register in Iowa
1891 establishments in Iowa